Sir William Bisset Berry  (26 July 1839 – 8 June 1922) was a Scots-born South African politician and the fourth Speaker of the Legislative Assembly of the Cape Colony.

Early life

Born in Aberdeen, Scotland, and educated at that University, Bisset Berry came to the Cape Colony in 1864 as a ship's surgeon and settled in Queenstown, Eastern Cape. His engagement to Agnes Baden-Powell was announced in The Illustrated London News of 27 April 1901, but they never married.

Politics
He later became Queenstown's mayor and was elected as its representative in the Cape Parliament in 1894.

Speaker of the Cape Parliament

Although he hated publicity, he was an engaging public speaker and a skilled debater so when there was a vacancy for the position of Speaker of Parliament, he was elected unopposed in 1898, even though he had only 4 years of parliamentary experience and his command of the Afrikaans language was not great. Reclusive and humble to a fault, he lamented his inexperience and lack of qualifications, but actually fared well and showed himself to be decisive and firm when necessary.

His term in office came at a time of great instability and he presided over the votes of no confidence in Sprigg's government and the application of martial law in the Cape Colony. In 1902, he distinguished himself with his strong opposition to the attempt by the British Colonial Office to suspend the Cape constitution.

He sought re-election in 1908, but was not returned to office (only being re-elected as an ordinary member in the 1910 election). The young James Molteno was elected to replace him as Speaker.

See also

 Speaker of the South African National Assembly

References

Further reading
 Royal Commonwealth Society: Proceedings Vol.29. London: Royal Colonial Institute, 1898.

|-

|-

Scottish emigrants to South Africa
South African Knights Bachelor
Politicians awarded knighthoods
South African Queen's Counsel
Members of the House of Assembly of the Cape Colony
Speakers of the House of Assembly of the Cape Colony
1839 births
1922 deaths
19th-century South African people